This article is an overview of the kings of the United Kingdom of Israel as well as those of its successor states and classical period kingdoms ruled by the Hasmonean dynasty and Herodian dynasty.

Kings of Ancient Israel and Judah 

The Hebrew Bible describes a succession of kings of a United Kingdom of Israel, and then of divided kingdoms, Israel and Judah.

In contemporary scholarship, the united monarchy is debated, due to a lack of archaeological evidence for it. It is generally accepted that a "House of David" existed, but some scholars believe that David could have only been the king or chieftain of Judah, which was likely small, and that the northern kingdom was a separate development. There are some dissenters to this view, including those who support the traditional narrative, and those support the united monarchy's existence but believe that the Bible contains theological exaggerations.

Overview table

House of Gideon 
Abimelech – the son of Gideon, was the first man declared a king in Israel.

House of Saul 

According to the Bible, the Tribes of Israel lived as a confederation under ad hoc charismatic leaders called judges. In around 1020 BCE, under extreme threat from foreign peoples, the tribes united to form the first United Kingdom of Israel. Samuel anointed Saul from the Tribe of Benjamin as the first king.

Saul (1020–1000 BCE)
Ish-bosheth (Esbaal) (1000–991 BCE)

House of David 

After Rehoboam reigned three years, the United Kingdom of Israel was divided in two – the northern Kingdom of Israel under Jeroboam, with its capital, first in Shechem, then Penuel, Tirzah, and finally Samaria, and ruled by a series of dynasties beginning with Jeroboam; and the southern Kingdom of Judah with its capital still in Jerusalem and ruled by the House of David. Under Hezekiah's rule in the Kingdom of Judah, the Neo-Assyrian Empire conquered and destroyed the northern kingdom 722 BCE leaving only the southern kingdom of Judah.

Kingdom of Israel (Samaria)

Kingdom of Judah

Family Tree

Monarchs of the Kingdom of Judea

Hasmonean Dynasty

Herodian Dynasty 

Herod the Great (r. 37–4 BCE)
Herod Agrippa (r. 41–44 CE)

Family Tree

See also 
History of ancient Israel and Judah
List of Jewish leaders in the Land of Israel
Lists of ancient kings

References

External links 

King at the Jewish Encyclopedia
Kings of the Jews at Project MUSE
Kings of the Jews: Israel, Judah, Hasmoneans & Herodians at The Algemeiner

 
Kings
Kings
Books of Kings
Israel
Kings
Kings
Kings
Israel
 
 
Lists of ancient people
Israel